The Regional Council of Nouvelle-Aquitaine is the deliberative assembly of the French region of Nouvelle-Aquitaine. The regional council is made up of 183 regional councilors elected for 6 years and is chaired by Alain Rousset.

History 
The Nouvelle-Aquitaine regional council, created by the law relating to the delimitation of regions, regional and departmental elections and modifying the electoral calendar of January 16, 2015 with effect from 1 January 2016, is the result of the merger of the regional councils of Aquitaine, Limousin and Poitou-Charentes, which respectively include 85, 43 and 55 elected officials (183 combined regional councilors).

Article 5 of the law of January 16, 2015 establishes the number of regional councilors at 183; it distributes the number of candidates by departmental section for the 2015 elections:

 13 for Charente;
 22 for Charente-Maritime;
 10 for Corrèze;
 6 for Creuse;
14 for Deux-Sèvres;
 15 for Dordogne;
 48 for Gironde;
14 for Haute-Vienne.
 14 for Landes;
 12 for Lot-et-Garonne;
 23 for Pyrénées-Atlantiques;
 16 for Vienne.

This number of candidates per departmental section includes two substitute candidates (article 3 of the law of January 16, 2016). Thus, the exact number of elected officials per department sitting on the Regional Council will be 11 for Charente, 20 for Charente-Maritime, 8 for Corrèze, 4 for Creuse etc.

Current composition

President 
Alain Rousset was elected first president of the Regional Council by the 2021 Nouvelle-Aquitaine regional election.

Vice-Presidents

Competences 
The law of August 7, 2015 on the new territorial organization of the Republic (NOTRe) specifies the competences of the region:

Transport 
Management of ports and airports, Regional Express Trains (TER), interurban and school road transport, roads, public bus stations, etc. The regions have become full-fledged transport organizing authorities.

High schools 
Construction, maintenance and operation of general education high schools and agricultural schools and establishments.

Vocational training 
Integration of young people in difficulty, training of job seekers, management of apprenticeship and work-study training, etc. All of the training competence has been transferred to the regions (regional public service for vocational guidance and training, use of authorizations, training of specific audiences, etc.).

Spatial planning and the environment 
The region is also in charge of the regional planning, Schéma Régional d’Aménagement, de Développement Durable et d’Égalité des Territoires (SRADDET or ) plan. It sets the objectives in terms of territorial balance and equality, the establishment of various infrastructures of regional interest, the opening up of rural areas, housing, economical management of space, intermodality and development of transport.

European Program management 
Managing authority for European funds ERDF, EAFRD and part of the ESF. With the EAFRD, the regions become responsible for writing and properly implementing regional operational programs the regional Rural Development Programs (RDPs).

References 

Nouvelle-Aquitaine
Politics of Aquitaine
Nouvelle-Aquitaine